Three Girls from the Rhine (German: Drei Mädels vom Rhein) is a 1955 West German comedy film directed by Georg Jacoby and starring Gardy Granass, Margit Saad and Fita Benkhoff. It was shot at the Tempelhof and Spandau Studios in West Berlin and the Wandsbek Studios in Hamburg. Filmed in Eastmancolor, location shooting took place in the Mosel including around Zell and at Schloss Lieser. The film's sets were designed by the art directors Erich Kettelhut and Johannes Ott.

Synopsis
Ever since a large hotel opened nearby, an inn in a wine-producing town on the Rhine has been struggling financially. The owner wants to retain control and pass the inn on to her three daughters, refusing offers to turn it into a milk bar. Her daughters set out to make sure the inn hosts the annual wine festival in order to save it.

Cast
 Gardy Granass as 	Susanne Hübner
 Margit Saad as 	Kitty Drechsler
 Fita Benkhoff as 	Therese Hübner
 Topsy Küppers as 	Sabine Hübner
 Siegfried Breuer Jr. as 	Werner Schulenburg
 Paul Henckels as Hannes
 Heinz Hilpert as Paul Schulenburg
 Robert Meyn as Philipp Drechsler
 Angelika Meissner as 	Kathrin Hübner
 Wolfgang Wahl as Fritz Junghans
 Frank Holms as 	Jack
 Ruth von Hagen as 	Rosa

References

Bibliography
 Bock, Hans-Michael & Bergfelder, Tim. The Concise CineGraph. Encyclopedia of German Cinema. Berghahn Books, 2009.

External links 
 

1955 films
1955 comedy films
German comedy films
West German films
1950s German-language films
Films directed by Georg Jacoby
1950s German films
Films shot at Wandsbek Studios
Films shot at Spandau Studios
Films shot at Tempelhof Studios

de:Drei Mädels vom Rhein